Roger Sweet is an American designer.  He grew up in Akron, Ohio and graduated from Miami University in Oxford, Ohio and the Institute of Design in Chicago, Illinois. He served as a lead designer at Mattel throughout much of the 1970s and 1980s and worked extensively on the Masters of the Universe toy line.  Before working for Mattel, Sweet held design positions with Walter Dorwin Teague Associates, an industrial design firm, and other design firms.  He worked on the accounts of such companies as Boeing,  Rubbermaid, Hoover, and Procter & Gamble, and on such products as the interior of the Boeing 747 jumbo jet airliner, and the Downy and Scope packages.

Origin of the Masters of the Universe Franchise

In 1976, Mattel's CEO Ray Wagner declined a request to produce a toyline of action figures based on the characters from the George Lucas film Star Wars. Upon the commercial success of the film trilogy during the next few years and all related merchandise, Mattel attempted to launch several unsuccessful toylines, none of which captured the public's imagination or made a significant dent in the toy market.  These included: Kid Gallant, a medieval knight; Robin and the Space Hoods, a sci-fi figure; and the daredevil Kenny Dewitt (pronounced "Can He Do It)?"

In the race to design the next hit action figure, Roger Sweet, a lead designer working for Mattel's Preliminary Design Department throughout much of the 1970s and 1980s, realized simplicity was the key to success he says in his book. According to his book Mastering the Universe: He-Man and the Rise and Fall of a Billion-Dollar Idea published in 2005, Sweet knew that if he gave marketing something they could sell, he'd won 90% of the battle.

"The only way I was going to have a chance to sell this [to Wagner] was to make three 3D models—big ones. I glued a Big Jim figure [from another Mattel toy line] into a battle action pose and I added a lot of clay to his body. I then had plaster casts made. These three prototypes, which I presented in late 1980, brought He-Man into existence."

"I simply explained that this was a powerful figure that could be taken anywhere and dropped into any context because he had a generic name: He-Man!"

—Roger Sweet

Notes

References

Further reading
LaConte, Vincent and Hoffman, Rebecca "Roger Sweet, M.S. 1960", ''Institute of Design, September, 2005

1955 births
Living people
Toy inventors
Artists from Akron, Ohio
Miami University alumni
Mattel people